The receiver in information theory is the receiving end of a communication channel. It receives decoded messages/information from the sender, who first encoded them. Sometimes the receiver is modeled so as to include the decoder. Real-world receivers like radio receivers or telephones can not be expected to receive as much information as predicted by the noisy channel coding theorem.

References 

Information theory